is the 15th single by Japanese singer Yōko Oginome. Written by Masao Urino (under the pseudonym "Reiji Asō") and Yoshimasa Inoue, the single was released on April 27, 1988, by Victor Entertainment.

Background and release
"Stardust Dream" became Oginome's third and final No. 1 single on Oricon's singles chart. It also sold over 136,000 copies.

The B-side, "Jungle Dance", was featured in the February 1988 edition of NHK's Minna no Uta.

Track listing

Charts
Weekly charts

Year-end charts

References

External links

1988 singles
Yōko Oginome songs
Japanese-language songs
Songs with lyrics by Masao Urino
Victor Entertainment singles
Oricon Weekly number-one singles